David Bard (1744 – March 12, 1815) was a United States representative from Pennsylvania. Born at Carroll's Delight in Adams County, Pennsylvania, he graduated from Princeton College (New Jersey) in 1773.

He studied theology and was licensed to preach by the Donegal Presbytery in 1777. He was ordained to the Presbyterian ministry at Lower Conotheague in 1779, and was a missionary in Virginia and west of the Allegheny Mountains. From 1786 to 1789, he was a pastor at Bedford, Pennsylvania, and later at Frankstown (now Hollidaysburg, Pennsylvania).

Bard was elected as a Democratic-Republican to the Fourth and Fifth Congresses, serving from March 4, 1795, to March 3, 1799.

He was elected as a Republican to the Eighth and to the six succeeding Congresses and served from March 4, 1803, until his death in Alexandria, Pennsylvania. He was interred in Sinking Valley Cemetery, near the hamlet of Arch Spring.

See also
List of United States Congress members who died in office (1790–1899)

References

The Political Graveyard

1744 births
1815 deaths
People from Adams County, Pennsylvania
Presbyterians from Pennsylvania
Democratic-Republican Party members of the United States House of Representatives from Pennsylvania
People from Huntingdon County, Pennsylvania
People from Bedford County, Pennsylvania
Princeton University alumni